The High Rock Petroglyph Shelter is a prehistoric rock art site in Crawford County, Arkansas.  Set in a high and rugged location in the western Ozark Mountains with views of the surrounding countryside, the site includes a sheltered petroglyph (pecked or incised) representation of a human figure.  The setting is one that is somewhat typical for other examples of rock art in the region.

The site was listed on the National Register of Historic Places in 1982.

See also
National Register of Historic Places listings in Crawford County, Arkansas

References

Archaeological sites on the National Register of Historic Places in Arkansas
National Register of Historic Places in Crawford County, Arkansas
Petroglyphs in Arkansas
Rock shelters in the United States